The 2012–13 Stony Brook Seawolves men's basketball team represented Stony Brook University in the 2012–13 NCAA Division I men's basketball season. They were coached by eighth year head coach Steve Pikiell and played their home games at Pritchard Gymnasium. They were members of the America East Conference. They finished the season 25–8, 14–2 in America East play to become America East regular season champions. They advanced to the semifinals of the America East tournament where they lost to Albany. As a regular season conference champion who failed to win their conference tournament, they received an automatic bid to the 2013 NIT. The Seawolves defeated Massachusetts in the first round for their first ever postseason tournament victory in school history. They lost in the second round to Iowa.

Previous season

After being picked second, behind the Boston Terriers, in the conference coaches preseason poll the Seawolves exceeded expectations capturing their second regular season championship in three years. Stony Brook went 5–6 through the non-conference regular season. Among their losses were Indiana, Northwestern, Boston College, and Rutgers in the Madison Square Garden Holiday Festival. Despite the slow start, the Seawolves cruised through the conference season capturing a program record 14 wins and 2 losses to earn the title. In the America East tournament Stony Brook went on to defeat the Binghamton Bearcats and Albany Great Danes to advance to their second consecutive championship game. The following week Stony Brook faced off against Vermont at the Stony Brook Arena falling by a score of 43–51. Despite their championship exit, Stony Brook participated in the 2012 NIT First Round falling by the score of 63–61 in the last bucket to end their season.

Before the season

Losses
The Seawolves lost to graduation Danny Carter, all-time points leader Bryan Dougher, Dallis Joyner, and Al Rapier.

Recruitment

Ranking and polls
Stony Brook was chosen second, behind the Vermont Catamounts, in the 2012 America East Preseason Coaches Poll ahead Boston University.

Roster

Coaching

Schedule

|-
!colspan=9 style="background:#; color:white;"| Non-conference regular season

|-
!colspan=9 style="background:#; color:white;"| America East regular season

|-
!colspan=9 style="background:#; color:white;"| 2013 America East tournament

|-
!colspan=9 style="background:#; color:white;"| 2013 NIT

References

Stony Brook
Stony Brook Seawolves men's basketball seasons
Stony Brook
Stony Brook
Stony Brook